The Hiding Place is a 1975 film based on the autobiographical book of the same name by Corrie ten Boom that recounts her and her family's experiences before and during their imprisonment in a Nazi concentration camp during the Holocaust during World War II.

The film was directed by James F. Collier. Jeanette Clift George received a Golden Globe nomination for Most Promising Newcomer - Female. The film was given limited release in its day and featured the last appearance from Arthur O'Connell.

Plot
As the Nazis invade the Netherlands in 1940, Corrie (Jeannette Clift George) and the rest of her family bravely choose to open their home to Jews as a hiding place, trusting that God would help them to do this. A part of their home is specially remodeled by members of the Dutch resistance to form a hidden room that the Jews can escape to in the event of a Nazi raid. Despite several mistakes on the family's part, such as allowing the Jews to sing so loudly on one occasion that it disturbed the neighbors, the Jews remained safely hidden. However, after the betrayal of a Dutch collaborator, the house is raided by Nazis on 28 February 1944, and the entire family and its friends are arrested. But despite thoroughly searching the house, the Jews and the hiding place are never found by authorities.

Corrie's father, Casper, dies before he reaches the concentration camp, and Corrie worries that she will never see her home again. The Nazis send Corrie and her sister, Betsie (Julie Harris), to the Ravensbrück concentration camp, Germany, for hiding Jews in their home. At the concentration camp, Betsie encourages Corrie to remain hopeful that God will rescue them from the brutalities they experience.

With little food, constant work and brutal treatment, the women suffer constantly, and Betsie dies. Ultimately, Corrie leaves the camp in December 1944 through what is discovered years later to have been a clerical error, as everyone else in her group of prisoners was gassed the next month (January 1945). Her life after the ordeal was dedicated to showing that Jesus' love is greater than the deepest pit into which humankind finds itself.

Cast
 Jeannette Clift as Corrie ten Boom
 Julie Harris as Betsie ten Boom
 Arthur O'Connell as Casper ten Boom, 'Papa'
 Robert Rietti as Willem ten Boom
 Pamela Sholto as Tine
 Paul Henley as Peter ten Boom
 Richard Wren as Kik ten Boom
 Broes Hartman as Dutch Policeman
 Lex van Delden as Young German Officer
 Tom van Beek as Dr. Heemstra
 Nigel Hawthorne as Pastor De Ruiter
 John Gabriel as Professor Zeiner
 Edward Burnham as Underground Leader
 Cyril Shaps as Building Inspector Smit
 Forbes Collins as Mason Smit
 Eileen Heckart as	Katje

Reviews
One review noted that the performers’ “Dutch accents sound quite Swedish on occasion.”

See also
 List of American films of 1975
 List of Holocaust films

References

External links
 
 Corrie ten Boom Impacts New Generation at billygraham.org
 
 

1975 films
Films about Christianity
1975 drama films
1970s English-language films
Drama films based on actual events
Films based on biographies
American independent films
American World War II films
Holocaust films
Films set in the Netherlands
Films set in Germany
Films directed by James F. Collier
1970s American films